William Rollinson  (born as William Henry Winslow) (June 10, 1856 – September 28, 1938), was a Major League Baseball catcher who played in one game on June 17, 1884 for the Washington Nationals of the Union Association.

He died in 1938 in Bristow, Virginia of Chronic Nephritis.

References

External links

1856 births
1938 deaths
Major League Baseball catchers
Baseball players from Maine
19th-century baseball players
Washington Nationals (UA) players
Worcester Grays players
Holyoke (minor league baseball) players
Lawrence (minor league baseball) players
Springfield (minor league baseball) players
People from Fairfield, Maine